Vergato (Medial Mountain Bolognese:  or ) is a comune (municipality) in the Metropolitan City of Bologna in the Italian region Emilia-Romagna, located about  southwest of Bologna.

Vergato borders the following municipalities: Castel d'Aiano, Gaggio Montano, Grizzana Morandi, Marzabotto, Valsamoggia, Zocca.

The town was almost entirely destroyed during the Gothic Line phase of the Italian Campaign in World War II. It is connected to Bologna by the Porrettana railway and by the Porrettana State Road.

Main sights
 Tarots Museum
 Church of the Assumption of Mary, Riola di Vergato

References

External links
 Official website

Cities and towns in Emilia-Romagna